Porteño Lake is a lake in Chilean Patagonia. Current scientific analysis indicates this surface water body was considerably more extensive in the early Holocene.

See also
 Great Tehuelche Paleolake
 Última Esperanza Sound

References
 C. Michael Hogan, Cueva del Milodon, The Megalithic Portal, ed. A. Burnham, 13 April, 2008
 Christy Harvey L. Smith. 1977. Sedimentology of the Late Cretaceous (Santonian-Maestrichtian) Tres Pasos Formation, Ultima Esperanza District, Southern Chile, Published by University of Wisconsin, 258 pages

Line notes

Lakes of Chile
Lakes of Magallanes Region